Lawrence S. Maxey (most often Lawrence Maxey or just Larry Maxey) is professor emeritus of clarinet at the University of Kansas School of Music.

A native of Indiana, Larry Maxey was a student of Keith Stein at Michigan State University, where he received his undergraduate degree. He holds Master of Music and Doctor of Musical Arts degrees from the Eastman School of Music, where he was a student of Stanley Hasty. Maxey taught on the full-time music faculties of Baylor University, California State University at Long Beach, and Michigan State University before joining the faculty at the University of Kansas, where he taught from 1971 until retiring in 2007.

Maxey's former students at KU have gone on to earn graduate degrees at a number of prestigious institutions, including Juilliard, the Shepherd School of Music at Rice University, the University of Michigan, Michigan State University, Arizona State University, the University of Wisconsin, and University of Oregon. Several of his students have been finalists in the MTNA national competition. Other KU clarinetists hold positions in universities and professional orchestras.

Maxey has performed nationwide and internationally as a soloist, chamber musician, and orchestral player. His career has taken him to Germany, France, Belgium, Portugal, Costa Rica and Lithuania. He performed with the Stamitz Quartet at the International Festival de Musica in Portugal in 1995 and toured Lithuania in 1996 and 2004, playing concerts with orchestras as well as conducting master classes.

Maxey was formerly principal clarinetist of the Kansas City Chamber Orchestra, the Rochester (New York) Chamber Orchestra, the Eastman Philharmonia Orchestra, and the Eastman Wind Ensemble, with which he recorded five albums under the direction of Frederick Fennell and Donald Hunsburger.

Maxey has been a featured soloist at conventions of the International Clarinet Association, at two national conventions of the National Association of College Wind and Percussion Instructors, and at several Oklahoma Clarinet Symposia. He has performed as a member of the Kansas Woodwinds at national conventions of the Music Educator's National Conference (Washington, D.C., and Kansas City, Missouri), the College Music Society (Detroit, Michigan), at the Midwest Band and Orchestra Clinic in Chicago, and at numerous state music conventions in Kansas.

Recent performances include a recital on the Fontana Chamber Music Series in Michigan in the summer of 2005, a residency at the State University of New York-Oswego in October 2005, as a soloist with the KU Jazz Ensemble (University of Kansas) in Duke Ellington's arrangement of Tchaikovsky's Nutcracker Suite in November 2005. He presented a clinic at the Kansas Music Educator's convention in February 2005, and performed there in February 2006.

Selected orchestral performances
Principal Clarinet, Lawrence Symphony Orchestra, Lawrence, Kansas
Principal Clarinet, Kansas City Chamber Orchestra, Kansas City, Missouri
Principal Clarinet, Rochester Chamber Orchestra, Rochester, New York
Principal Clarinet, Eastman Philharmonic Orchestra, Rochester, New York
Principal Clarinet, Waco Civic Orchestra, Waco, Texas
Principal Clarinet, Seventh Army Symphony Orchestra, Stuttgart, Germany

Selected performances as soloist
Baker University
Baylor University
Central Missouri State University
Eastman School of Music
East Texas State University
Long Beach State University
Michigan State University
North Park College
University of Iowa
University of Kansas
University of Michigan, Ann Arbor
University of Michigan, Flint
University of Oklahoma
Valparaiso University
Western Michigan University

Selected performances—chamber music
Baker University
Eastman School of Music
East Texas State University
Michigan State University
Missouri Western University
National Museum of Art, Costa Rica
National University, Costa Rica
Southwest Missouri State University
University of Costa Rica, San Jose
University of Costa Rica, Santa Cruz
University of Kansas
University of Missouri
University of Nebraska
University of Oklahoma
Washington University in St. Louis

Selected lecture recitals
Central Missouri State University
Eastman School of Music
Emporia State University
Union College
University of Kansas
University of Missouri, Kansas City
University of Oklahoma

Selected publications
Maxey, Lawrence. The Copland Clarinet Concerto. The Clarinet, Summer, 1985, Volume XII, Number 4, pages 28–32.
Maxey, Lawrence. Clarinet Section Intonation. The Instrumentalist, February 1979, Volume 33, Number 7, pages 86–88.
Maxey, Lawrence. Two Great American Clarinetists: A Profile. National Association of College Wind and Percussion Instructors Journal, Fall, 1974, Volume 23, Number 1, pages 14–15.
Maxey, Lawrence. The Rose Thirty-Two Etudes: A Study in Metamorphosis. The Clarinet, August 1974, Volume 1, Number 4, pages 8–9.
Maxey, Lawrence. Miniaturization in Clarinet Tonguing. Kansas Music Review, September 1972, Volume 34, Number 3, pages 17–18.
Maxey, Lawrence. Clarinet Tonguing: The All-Important First Steps. Kansas Music Review, October 1971, Volume 33, Number 4, pages 22–23.

References

Year of birth missing (living people)
Living people
American classical clarinetists
Michigan State University alumni
Eastman School of Music alumni
Baylor University faculty
California State University, Long Beach faculty
Michigan State University faculty
University of Kansas faculty
21st-century clarinetists